"Bedroom Eyes" is a song by Australian singer Kate Ceberano. It was released as the first single from her third solo album, Brave, in April 1989 through Regular and Festival Records. "Bedroom Eyes" spent six weeks at  2 on the Australian ARIA Singles Chart and became the seventh-highest-selling single in Australia as well as the highest-selling single by an Australian artist in 1989.

Track listings
Australian and New Zealand 7-inch single

Australian 12-inch single

Charts

Weekly charts

Year-end charts

Certifications

Release history

References

Kate Ceberano songs
1989 singles
1989 songs
ARIA Award-winning songs
Festival Records singles
London Records singles
Regular Records singles